Jest is a JavaScript testing framework built on top of Jasmine and maintained by Meta (formerly Facebook). It was designed and built by Christoph Nakazawa with a focus on simplicity and support for large web applications. It works with projects using Babel, TypeScript, Node.js, React, Angular, Vue.js and Svelte. Jest doesn't require a lot of configuration for first-time users of a testing framework.

Usage and examples

Installation 
Use the JavaScript package manager npm to install Jest in Node.js:$ npm install --save-dev jest

Example 
In this example, we will write a test case for the following module saved as sum.js:
function sum(a, b) {
  return a + b;
}

module.exports = sum;

Our test case will be in a file named sum.test.js for Jest to automatically pick it up as a test case for sum.js.  

The contents of the file with the test case will be: 

const sum = require('./sum');

test('adds 1 + 2 to equal 3', => {
  expect(sum(1, 2)).toBe(3);
});

Then, from the command line, we run this command:

$ npm run test

This runs the test and outputs the corresponding result on the command line.

See also 
 List of unit testing frameworks
 Jasmine
 Mocha
 npm
 QUnit
 Unit.js
JavaScript framework
JavaScript library

References

External links 
 GitHub repository
 Jest documentation

JavaScript libraries
JavaScript programming tools
Software using the MIT license
JavaScript web frameworks